The Other Guy or The Other Guys may refer to:

"The Other Guy" (song), 1982 single by Little River Band
The Other Guy (TV series), a 2017 Australian television series
"The Other Guy"' song from the B2K album Pandemonium!
The Other Guys, 2010 film
The Other Guys (University of St Andrews), an a cappella group from the University of St Andrews
"The Other Guys" (Stargate SG-1), episode from the sixth season of Stargate SG-1

See also

Some Other Guy, a song performed by The Beatles
"Chuck Versus the Other Guy", the 13th episode of Chuck